Govurqala is a name shared by four archaeological sites in Azerbaijan, located in Shaki.

Local Govurqala (220×75 m) is a 5th–14th-century populated place and is also a walled defense stand with round and square towers. The wall width is 1 m at the bottom and 80 cm on top with a height of 5–15 m. Clay jugs, a frying pan, vat and other items were found there. The stand is supposed to be built in Sasanid period to prevent the Khazarian raids and demolished during the Timurid attack.

Notes

Archaeological sites in Azerbaijan
Former populated places in the Caucasus